The 1999 WNBA Season was the Women's National Basketball Association's third season. The 1999 season saw two expansion teams join the league, the Minnesota Lynx and Orlando Miracle.  The schedule was increased from 30 to 32 games per team. The season ended with the Houston Comets winning their third WNBA championship.

Regular season standings
Eastern Conference

Western Conference

Season award winners

Playoffs

There were 12 teams in the league. For the playoffs, the three teams with the best record in each conference were seeded one to three. The top seeded team in each conference got a bye for the first round.

Coaches

Eastern Conference
Charlotte Sting: Dan Hughes
Cleveland Rockers: Linda Hill-MacDonald
Detroit Shock: Nancy Lieberman
New York Liberty: Richie Adubato
Orlando Miracle: Carolyn Peck
Washington Mystics: Nancy Darsch

Western Conference
Houston Comets: Van Chancellor
Los Angeles Sparks: Orlando Woolridge
Minnesota Lynx: Brian Agler
Phoenix Mercury: Cheryl Miller
Sacramento Monarchs: Sonny Allen
Utah Starzz: Fred Williams

External links
1999 WNBA Awards
1999 WNBA Playoffs

 
1999
1999 in American women's basketball
1998–99 in American basketball by league
1999–2000 in American basketball by league